Commercial Academy of Satu Mare is a university founded in 1997 in Satu Mare, Romania, with branches in several other counties. The university is currently constructing a new campus on a  plot located in the largest park in Satu Mare, the Garden of Rome that was completed in 2010.

Academic specialization
Finance and banking
Management
Accountancy and Informatics
Economy of Commerce, Tourism and Services
International Economic Relations

References

External links
 Official website

Educational institutions established in 1997
Universities in Satu Mare
1997 establishments in Romania